The 2020 Arema F.C. season is Arema's 31st competitive season. The club will compete in Indonesia League 1 and Piala Indonesia. Arema Football Club a professional football club based in Malang, East Java, Indonesia. The season covers the period from 1 January 2020 to 20 January 2021.

Squad information

Current squad

Transfers

In

Out

Loan In

Loan Out

Review and events 
The season featured a seven-month hiatus from March to October 2020 after the outbreak of the coronavirus pandemic. On 29 September 2020, PSSI has officially decided to postpone the continuation of Liga 1 for a month after coordinating with Kemenpora and PT LIB because the police have not given permission to the crowd. PSSI stated on 29 October 2020 that the competition will not be held until 2021. But it's still not clear whether this season will continue or cancelled. They determined that the Liga 1 will be held again in February 2021 and scheduled to finish in July 2021. On 20 January 2021, the results of the exco PSSI meeting stated that the League 1 competition was officially canceled. 

On 3 August 2020, Head coach Mario Gómez resigned because disagree with SKEP 48 and 53 PSSI issues, which were taken into account during the COVID-19 pandemic. After Mario Gomez resigned, management handed over team leadership to the three assistant coaches. On 17 September 2020, Arema FC officially introduces the new head coach from Brazil Carlos Oliviera.

Pre-seasons and friendlies

Friendlies

East Java Governor Cup

Group stage

Knockout phase

Match results

Liga 1

Matches

League table

Statistics

Squad appearances and goals

|-
! colspan=14 style=background:#dcdcdc; text-align:center|Goalkeepers

|-
! colspan=14 style=background:#dcdcdc; text-align:center|Defenders

|-
! colspan=14 style=background:#dcdcdc; text-align:center|Midfielders

|-
! colspan=14 style=background:#dcdcdc; text-align:center|Forwards

|-
! colspan=14 style=background:#dcdcdc; text-align:center|Players transferred or loaned out during the season the club 

|-
|}

Top scorers
The list is sorted by shirt number when total goals are equal.

Notes

References

External links 
 Arema F.C. Official website
 Arema F.C.'s Profile on Liga 1 Official Website 

Arema
Arema